Terry Darracott (6 October 1950 – 22 March 2022) was an English professional footballer who played as a left back for Everton and Wrexham in the Football League and for the Tulsa Roughnecks in the North American Soccer League.

On retiring as a player he held coaching positions at Everton, Manchester City and Blackburn Rovers, and was employed as a European scout for Bolton Wanderers.

In October 2008, Darracott joined Wrexham as assistant to manager Dean Saunders, with whom he had worked at Blackburn.  Restricted mobility due to a hip problem forced him to leave Wrexham a year later, and he returned to scouting for Bolton.

He provided opposition analysis as part of Hull City's scouting team.

Darracott died on 22 March 2022, at the age of 71.

References

External links
 Stats and photo at Sporting Heroes
 

1950 births
2022 deaths
Footballers from Liverpool
English footballers
Association football fullbacks
Everton F.C. players
Tulsa Roughnecks (1978–1984) players
Wrexham A.F.C. players
English Football League players
North American Soccer League (1968–1984) players
Blackburn Rovers F.C. non-playing staff
Bolton Wanderers F.C. non-playing staff
Hull City A.F.C. non-playing staff
English expatriate sportspeople in the United States
Expatriate soccer players in the United States
English expatriate footballers
Everton F.C. non-playing staff
Manchester City F.C. non-playing staff
Grimsby Town F.C. non-playing staff